Graciela Aranis, artistically known as Chela Aranís (October 6, 1908 - December 12, 1996), was a Chilean painter and cartoonist associated with the "Generación del 28" and the Grupo Montparnasse.

Biography
Graciela Aranis was born in Santiago, October 6, 1908. She was the daughter of Pedro Aranís and Eduvigis Valdivia.

She studied at the School of Fine Arts of the University of Chile, where she was a student of Ricardo Richon Brunet, María Aranis, and Juan Francisco González, and at the Scandinavian Academy, where she studied under the tutelage of André Lhote and Marcel-Lenoir. At the beginning of her career, her work was characterized "by an opaque and dark color, influenced by the dramatic spirits of the time, and then in Paris, the artist was able to release her plastic vision towards the spontaneous expression of form and color".

Aranis participated in several individual and group exhibitions during her career, including those held at the Official Hall of Santiago in 1922, 1923, 1924, 1927, 1928, 1929 and 1939; at the Ibero-American Exhibition of Seville (1929); at the II São Paulo Art Biennial (1953); the exhibition La mujer en el arte at the Chilean National Museum of Fine Arts (1975); among several others in Chile, Switzerland, the United States and Brazil. She was married to the Swiss artist Serge Brignoni. She died in Bern, Switzerland, December 12, 1996.

References

1908 births
1996 deaths
20th-century Chilean painters
Chilean women painters
Chilean cartoonists
Women cartoonists
People from Santiago
University of Chile alumni